Aatto Nuora (23 October 1895 – 18 July 1990) was a Finnish sports shooter. He competed in the 50 m pistol event at the 1936 Summer Olympics.

References

External links
 

1895 births
1990 deaths
Finnish male sport shooters
Olympic shooters of Finland
Shooters at the 1936 Summer Olympics
People from Virolahti
Sportspeople from Kymenlaakso